Massachusetts House of Representatives' 4th Suffolk district in the United States is one of 160 legislative districts included in the lower house of the Massachusetts General Court. It covers part of the city of Boston in Suffolk County. Democrat David Biele of South Boston has represented the district since 2019.

The current district geographic boundary overlaps with that of the Massachusetts Senate's 1st Suffolk district.

Representatives
 Charles Hale, circa 1858-1859 
 William B. Spooner, circa 1858 
 John H. Wilkins, circa 1859 
 Joseph H. Gleason, circa 1888 
 William H. Prebble, circa 1888 
 William J. Francis, circa 1920 
 James J. Mellen, circa 1920 
 Vincent Francis Cronin, circa 1951 
 Thomas H. Spurr, Jr., circa 1951 
 Melvin H. King, circa 1975 
 Brian Wallace
 Nick Collins
 David Biele, 2019-current

See also
 List of Massachusetts House of Representatives elections
 Other Suffolk County districts of the Massachusetts House of Representatives: 1st, 2nd, 3rd, 5th, 6th, 7th, 8th, 9th, 10th, 11th, 12th, 13th, 14th, 15th, 16th, 17th, 18th, 19th
 List of Massachusetts General Courts
 List of former districts of the Massachusetts House of Representatives

Images
Portraits of legislators

References

External links
 Ballotpedia
  (State House district information based on U.S. Census Bureau's American Community Survey).
 League of Women Voters of Boston

House
Government of Suffolk County, Massachusetts